The men's road race at the 1983 UCI Road World Championships was the 50th edition of the event. The race was won by Greg LeMond of the United States.

Final classification

References

Men's Road Race
UCI Road World Championships – Men's road race
1983 Super Prestige Pernod